John Baptist Lafargue (June 1864 - ?) was an educator and editor in Louisiana.

He studied at a school established with support from the Peabody Educational Fund.

He founded Peabody Industrial School and was the principal of the Peabody Training School in Alexandria. He organized the Colored Teachers Association in Louisiana in 1901. He was state secretary of the CFA. He edited The Banner newspaper in Alexandria, Louisiana.

He married Sarah C. B. Mayo.

There is a J. B. Lafargue Special Education Center in Rapides.

References

Educators from Louisiana

1864 births
Year of death missing